Cheung Shan Estate is a public housing estate located between Shek Wai Kok Estate and Lei Muk Shue Estate, and near Shing Mun Valley Park and Shing Mun Tunnels in Tsuen Wan, New Territories, Hong Kong. Formerly the site of Cheung Pei Shan Temporary Housing Area, it consists of three residential buildings completed in 1978.

Houses

Demographics
According to the 2016 by-census, Cheung Shan Estate had a population of 4,746. The median age was 48.6 and the majority of residents (95.1 per cent) were of Chinese ethnicity. The average household size was 3 people. The median monthly household income of all households (i.e. including both economically active and inactive households) was HK$21,500.

Politics
Cheung Shan Estate is located in Cheung Shek constituency of the Tsuen Wan District Council. It was formerly represented by Matthew Lai Man-fai, who was elected in the 2019 elections until July 2021.

Education 
Cheung Shan Estate is in Primary One Admission (POA) School Net 62, which includes schools in Tsuen Wan and areas nearby. The net includes multiple aided schools and one government school, Hoi Pa Street Government Primary School.

See also

Public housing estates in Tsuen Wan

References

Tsuen Wan
Public housing estates in Hong Kong